Bethel Baptist Church is a historic church complex and cemetery located at Midlothian, Chesterfield County, Virginia.  It was built in 1894, and is a brick church with a steeply pitched gable roof in the Late Gothic Revival style. It is the third church on this site.  Wings were added to the original church in 1906, 1980, and 1987. Also on the property is the contributing church cemetery that includes approximately 500 burials including soldiers of virtually every war in American history from the American Revolutionary War through the Vietnam War.

It was listed on the National Register of Historic Places in 1999.

References

Baptist churches in Virginia
Churches on the National Register of Historic Places in Virginia
Gothic Revival church buildings in Virginia
Churches completed in 1894
Buildings and structures in Chesterfield County, Virginia
National Register of Historic Places in Chesterfield County, Virginia
Southern Baptist Convention churches